This is a list of airports in Wisconsin (a U.S. state), grouped by type and sorted by location. It contains all public-use and military airports in the state. Some private-use and former airports may be included where notable, such as airports that were previously public-use, those with commercial enplanements recorded by the FAA or airports assigned an IATA airport code.

Airports

See also 

 Wikipedia:WikiProject Aviation/Airline destination lists: North America#Wisconsin

References 

Federal Aviation Administration (FAA):
 FAA Airport Data (Form 5010) from National Flight Data Center (NFDC), also available from AirportIQ 5010
 National Plan of Integrated Airport Systems for 2019–2023
 Passenger Boarding (Enplanement) Data for CY 2016, updated 5 October 2017

State:
 Wisconsin Department of Transportation (WisDOT): Airport Directory

Other sites used as a reference when compiling and updating this list:
 Aviation Safety Network - used to check IATA airport codes
 Great Circle Mapper: Airports in Wisconsin - used to check IATA and ICAO airport codes
  Abandoned & Little-Known Airfields: Wisconsin

 
Airports
Wisconsin
Airports